E. B. Wilson may refer to:
 Edgar Bright Wilson (1908–1992), American chemist working in spectroscopy
 Edmund Beecher Wilson (1856–1939), American zoologist and geneticist
 Edwin Bidwell Wilson (1879–1964), American mathematician and pioneer in vector analysis
 E. B. Wilson and Company, British locomotive manufacturer

Wilson, E. B.